Kang Hyung-ho (born March 8, 1988), also known by his stage name PITTA, is a South Korean singer and member of the crossover quartet Forestella. A former chemical engineer, Kang had been an amateur singer and rose to fame after participating in the singing competition Phantom Singer 2.

Early life
Kang is a native of Busan. He aspired to be a musician since childhood but his parents had been against it. Instead, he focused on his studies and was admitted to Pusan National University on a scholarship, eventually graduating with a degree in chemical engineering. After completing his mandatory military service and graduating from college, he worked for Lotte BP (now Lotte INEOS) in research and development.

Singing career
While juggling his career at a major corporate company, Kang continued to pursue his musical interests as the main vocalist and guitarist with PITTA, a rock band he had formed together with his friends as college students. They continued to play even after graduating and working. In 2016, they gained local celebrity status after winning the Busan Employees' Band Competition for amateur musicians.

Phantom Singer
Kang heard about JTBC holding auditions for the second season of Phantom Singer and decided to apply. Of the 32 contestants who passed the preliminary screening, he was the only one without any formal training in singing or the performing arts. He sang "The Phantom of the Opera" for the televised audition in front of the panel of judges and sang Christine Daaé and the Phantom's parts himself in both the countertenor and his natural tenor registers. The video uploaded to Naver went viral immediately and garnered several million views by the final. Initially he commuted back and forth between Seoul and Busan during filming but ultimately took a year-long sabbatical from his job with the option of returning should Phantom Singer 2 not work out.

Debut with Forestella and solo activities 
Prior to the final of Phantom Singer 2, Kang was grouped together with Bae Doo-hoon, Cho Min-kyu and Ko Woo-rim to form Forestella. He had never been grouped with any of the other members up until the random quartet stage. They eventually won the competition and debuted on March 14, 2018. 

Kang signed as a solo artist with Arts & Artists, which had also managed Forestella as a group until June 2021. In October 2020, he made his debut release with the digital single "Universe" under the stage name PITTA. It was the name of the band had been part of from his amateur days and he chose to use it as a homage to his members. In November 2021, he released the self-composed extended play ID: PITTA, his first non-single release as a solo artist.

Discography

Extended plays

Singles

References

External Links
Profile on Arts & Artists

1988 births
Living people
People from Busan
Pusan National University alumni
South Korean male singers